George Vance Murry S.J. (December 28, 1948June 5, 2020) was an American prelate of the Catholic Church and member of the Society of Jesus.  He served as bishop of the Diocese of Youngstown from 2007 to 2020.

Murry previously served as an auxiliary bishop of the Archdiocese of Chicago from 1995 to 1998 and as bishop of the Diocese of Saint Thomas in the U.S. Virgin Islands from 1998 to 2007  He submitted his resignation in May 2020 after suffering a relapse of leukemia, but died before it was accepted.

Biography

Early life 
Murry was born in Camden, New Jersey, on December 28, 1948, to Viola Murry and George Vance Murry II.  He originally belonged to the African Methodist Episcopal Church but converted to Catholicism when he was a child while attending a parochial school in Baltimore, Maryland.  He later graduated from Camden Catholic High School in Camden, New Jersey.

Murry attended St. Joseph's College in Philadelphia, St. Thomas Seminary in Bloomfield, Connecticut, and St. Mary's Seminary in Baltimore, obtaining a Bachelor of Philosophy degree in 1972.  In that same year, he was admitted as a member of the Society of Jesus.  After completing his period of novitiate in 1974, Murry obtained a Master of Divinity degree from the Jesuit School of Theology at Berkeley in Berkeley, California, and a Masters and Doctorate in American Cultural History from George Washington University in Washington, D.C.

Priesthood 
On June 9, 1979, Murry was ordained to the priesthood by Archbishop William Donald Borders in the Jesuit province of Maryland.

Murry became an assistant professor of American studies at Georgetown University in 1986, and taught at that institution for four years. He also served as president of Archbishop Carroll High School in Washington, D.C. from 1989 until 1994, when he was appointed associate vice president for academic affairs at the University of Detroit Mercy.

Auxiliary Bishop of Chicago 
Pope John Paul II appointed Murry as an auxiliary bishop of the Archdiocese of Chicago and titular bishop of Fuerteventura on January 24, 1995.  He was consecrated on March 20, 1995. Cardinal Joseph Bernardin served as the principal consecrator, assisted by Auxiliary Bishops Alfred Abramowicz and Timothy Lyne.

Coadjutor Bishop and Bishop of Saint Thomas
Murry was appointed as coadjutor bishop of the Diocese of Saint Thomas by Pope John Paul II on May 5, 1998.  As such, he had the right of succession when the current bishop resigned. Murry became bishop on June 30, 1999, after the resignation of Bishop Elliot Thomas.

Bishop of Youngstown 
On January 30, 2007, Pope Benedict XVI appointed Murry as the fifth bishop of the Diocese of Youngstown.  Later in 2007, he was elected secretary of the United States Conference of Catholic Bishops (USCCB). Murry was re-elected to a three-year term as secretary in 2008. Murry served as chair of the USCCB Committee on Domestic Policy.  He was appointed chair of the National Catholic Educational Association in 2015, serving until the end of 2017.

In September 2015, Pope Francis appointed Murry to the Synod of Bishops that met in October 2015 to discuss family life. At that meeting, he said he supported the view that church could change its practice toward the divorced and remarried without altering doctrine. Murry said he supported greater participation from theologians, cultural historians, and other experts, and that the Synod needed to find a way to hear the voices of the people who were the subject of its discussions. He also supported the creation of commission to consider allowing women to serve as deacons. He said: "It would be a wise idea to look into it, to learn more about it and then to present a proposal to the Pope to say there either are theological problems, or not. And if not, let’s move forward."

Murry served on several. boards of directors and trustees:

 University of Detroit
 St. Joseph's University in Philadelphia
 Mount St. Mary's College
 Loyola Academy in Detroit 
 Catholic Relief Services 
 Loyola University Chicago
 Fairfield University in Fairfield, Connecticut

In April 2018, Murry was diagnosed with acute myeloid leukemia. He received chemotherapy treatment at the Cleveland Clinic in Cleveland, Ohio. On September 4, 2018, he returned to work part-time at the diocese. After being in remission, Murry suffered a relapse in April 2020.

Retirement and legacy 
Murry submitted his resignation as bishop of the Diocese of Youngstown to Pope Francis on May 26, 2020, four years before the mandatory retirement age of 75. George Murry died on June 5, 2020, a few days after being admitted to Memorial Sloan Kettering Cancer Center in New York City for treatment.

See also

 Catholic Church hierarchy
 Catholic Church in the United States
 Historical list of the Catholic bishops of the United States
 List of Catholic bishops of the United States
 Lists of patriarchs, archbishops, and bishops

References

External links

 Roman Catholic Diocese of Youngstown Official Site
 National Black Catholic Congress bio of George Murry

|-

1948 births
2020 deaths
People from Camden, New Jersey
Camden Catholic High School alumni
Converts to Roman Catholicism from Methodism
St. Mary's Seminary and University alumni
20th-century American Jesuits
21st-century American Jesuits
University of Detroit Mercy faculty
African-American Roman Catholic bishops
Roman Catholic Archdiocese of Chicago
Roman Catholic bishops of Saint Thomas
Roman Catholic bishops of Youngstown
20th-century Roman Catholic bishops in the United States
21st-century Roman Catholic bishops in the United States
Jesuit bishops
Religious leaders from Illinois
Columbian College of Arts and Sciences alumni
Saint Joseph's University alumni
Catholics from New Jersey
Deaths from cancer in New York (state)
Deaths from acute myeloid leukemia
21st-century African-American people
American Roman Catholic bishops by contiguous area of the United States
African-American Catholic consecrated religious